Nicolás Pauls (born December 20, 1973) is an Argentine actor and musician. The brother of actor Gastón Pauls, he made his breakthrough in the television series 90-60-90 modelos and in the film Buenos Aires Vice Versa in 1996, for which he earned Argentine Film Critics Association Awards for Best New Star nomination. He is a vegetarian and supports animal welfare organisations, like publishing a video with Sinergia Animal against battery cages for egg laying hens in May 2019

Filmography

Films

Televisión

Awards and nominations

References

External links 
 www.nicolaspauls.com
 
 

1973 births
Argentine male film actors
Argentine male telenovela actors
Argentine male television actors
Living people
Male actors from Buenos Aires